MidPoint Indie Summer Series is an annual event held at Fountain Square in Cincinnati, Ohio hosted by MidPoint Music Festival. The series showcases artists from around the world every Friday from 7–11 pm during the summer. As the name suggests, it highlights Indie Rock music but also displays other genres like Rock, Pop, and Folk music.

List of lineups by year

2010

June 4, 2010
The Trouble With Boys, Paper Airplane, The Love Language, Camera Obscura

June 11, 2010
For Algernon, The Minor League, Wild Nothing, Neon Indian

June 18, 2010
Cash Flagg, The Prohibitionists, Brighton MA, Jason Isbell and The 400 Unit

June 25, 2010
Oh No Boiling Acid, The Tigerlillies, The Koala Fires, Smoking Popes

July 2, 2010
Come On Caboose, No No Knots, Enlou, Pomegranates

July 9, 2010
Kasparov, Fists of Love, State Song, Why?

July 16, 2010
Okay Lindon, The Flux Capacitors, Pop Empire, You You’re Awesome

July 23, 2010
Sparrow Bellows, The Fairmount Girls, The Chocolate Horse, Wussy

July 30, 2010
Darlene, Cotton Jones, Bob Log III, Eat Sugar

August 6, 2010
Goose, Messerly & Ewing, The Sweep, Dawes

August 13, 2010
Soapland, The Guitars, The Lions Rampant, Buffalo Killers

August 20, 2010
TBA, The Harlequins, Lightning Love, Bad Veins

August 27, 2010
20th Century Tokyo Princess, J Dorsey Blues Revival, Oxford Cotton, Brian Olive

September 3, 2010
TBA, TBA, The Seedy Seeds, We Are Scientists

2009

May 29, 2009
Iolite, Fairmount Girls, Peter Adams

June 5, 2009
J. Dorsey Blues Revival, Mysts of Time, Lions Rampant

June 12, 2009
Wake the Bear, Cash Flagg, Cari Clara

June 19, 2009
The Emeralds, Kim Taylor, The Hiders

June 26, 2009
The Sleeping Sea, The Damn Thing, Culture Queer, Mucca Pazza

July 3, 2009
Eagle to Squirrel, Abiyah, Freekbass

July 10, 2009
Enlou, Bloodsugars, Pomegranates

July 17, 2009
Pasquali, The Tigerlillies, Roundhead, Wussy

July 24, 2009
A Decade to Die For, Thing One, You You're Awesome, Bad Veins

July 31, 2009
Messerly & Ewing, Nathan Holscher, Matthew Shelton's Picnic

References

Music festivals in Ohio
Indie rock festivals
Festivals in Cincinnati
Music of Cincinnati